Together was a French house duo consisting of DJ Falcon and one member of Daft Punk, Thomas Bangalter. The duo released two songs, one each in 2000 and 2002, on Bangalter's own record label, Roulé: "Together" and "So Much Love to Give".

Recording history
Falcon had first worked with Bangalter when Falcon had sought to release his debut EP Hello My Name Is DJ Falcon on Bangalter's label Roulé. Falcon reminisced on how their birthdays were only a day apart; Bangalter thus chose the day in between to work on a song together, although they danced more than they produced.

The song "Together" was released in 2000 while Together's second track, "So Much Love to Give", was released in 2002. An imported version of the single peaked at number 71 on the UK Singles Chart in January 2003 (credited to Thomas Bangalter & DJ Falcon rather than Together). "So Much Love to Give" contains a sample of "Love's Such a Wonderful Thing" by The Real Thing, which repeats throughout the song. The same sample was also used by Freeloaders in their 2005 single also titled "So Much Love to Give", and by Fedde le Grand, in his song "So Much Love".

Eric Prydz's "Call on Me" is sometimes mistaken as a Together release due to its use of Steve Winwood's 1982 song "Valerie". DJ Falcon stated in an interview that he and Bangalter had sampled "Valerie" years previously and used it in DJ sets, with no intention to release it as a single despite demand from various outlets.

Musical elements of the song "Together" later appeared during the encore performance of Daft Punk's 2007 live sets. It is paired with Stardust's song, "Music Sounds Better with You", as well as Daft Punk's tracks "Human After All", "One More Time", and "Aerodynamic". A recording of the encore is included in the two-disc edition of the live album Alive 2007. Both the sets and the album renewed interest in the song.

In 2013, Bangalter and Falcon worked together with Guy-Manuel de Homem-Christo to produce the Daft Punk track "Contact", which appeared in the album Random Access Memories.

Discography

Singles
 "Together" (2000)
 "So Much Love to Give" (2002)

References

External links
 
 
 

French record producers
French house music groups
French musical duos